"Alternative Girlfriend" is a song by Canadian band Barenaked Ladies, written by Stephen Duffy and Steven Page, from their 1994 album Maybe You Should Drive. The song was released as the second single from the album and peaked at No. 22 on the Canadian RPM Top Singles chart and No. 4 on the RPM Adult Contemporary chart. It later appeared on their 2001 compilation, Disc One: All Their Greatest Hits.

Composition
Steven Page explained in the liner notes of the album Disc One: All Their Greatest Hits (1991–2001) that the song was an attempt to mimic the grunge music from Seattle, and that it is the first song they wrote with a heavier sound (with the exception of "Grade 9" from Gordon).

Personnel
 Steven Page – lead vocals, acoustic guitar
 Ed Robertson – electric guitar, background vocals
 Jim Creeggan – electric bass, background vocals
 Andy Creeggan – electric piano, organ, tambourine, background vocals
 Tyler Stewart – drums

Charts

Weekly charts

Year-end charts

In popular culture
The song was featured in the Baby Blues episode "Rodney Has Two Daddies". Coincidentally, that series used "It's All Been Done" (from BNL's 1998 album Stunt) as its theme song.

References

External links

1994 singles
Barenaked Ladies songs
Songs written by Stephen Duffy
Songs written by Steven Page
1994 songs
Reprise Records singles